Jervoise is a surname and given name. Notable people with these names include:

Surname 
 George Purefoy-Jervoise (1770–1847), English landowner, MP for Salisbury and for Hampshire
 Jervoise Clarke Jervoise (Yarmouth MP) (c.1743–1808), English Whig Member of Parliament (MP) for Yarmouth and Hampshire between 1768 and 1808
 Sir Jervoise Clarke-Jervoise, 2nd Baronet (1804–1889), MP for Hampshire 1857–1868
 Richard Jervoise (1615 – before 1645), MP for Whitchurch 1640–1645
Thomas Jervoise, several people

Given name 
 Jervoise Athelstane Baines (1847–1925), British officer in the Indian civil service
 Jervoise Smith (1828–1884), British banker, MP for Penryn and Falmouth 1866–1868

See also 
 Clarke-Jervoise baronets